Blood on the Highway is an American comedy horror film that was first released in March 2008 by BOH Productions. The film premiered at the AFI Dallas Film Festival on March 28, 2008. The film was directed by Barak Epstein and Blair Rowan and stars Deva George, Robin Gierhart, Nate Rubin, and features Nicholas Brendon and Tom Towles (his final film role who retired from acting before his death on April 2, 2015). The screenplay to the film, is an homage/parody to horror films, was written by Chris Gardner and Blair Rowan.

Plot
The populace of the lethargic small town Fate, TX gathers for the grand opening of Consumart, a glossy new one-stop-shopping box store. The enthusiastic patrons merrily dispense into the store as the doors open at sunset.  Before the unsuspecting shoppers have time to question the fact that the store is stocked with coffins, terror erupts and the store explodes into a bloodbath. A few weeks later, three unmindful, egocentric twenty somethings, Carrie (Robin Gierhart), Sam (Nate Rubin), and Bone (Deva George), embark on a road trip to Mr. Fire, a festival which shares eerie similarities to Burning Man, and accidentally wander into Fate, unaware of its population's ill-fated transformation... into vampires.  Carrie, a superficial, aggressive scenester is dating Sam's wallet.  Sam is a shrill, immature, hypochondriac, well-to-do young man. Bone, an uncaring badass with a malicious speech pattern, is still nurturing a yearning for Carrie predicated upon a drunken, frolicsome one night stand.

After a confrontation with two blood-thirsty convenience store clerks in which Sam is repeatedly bitten and attacked, Bone is forced to butcher them. Now the protagonists begin to wonder if something strange might be going on in the town.  Luckily, but only in the sense that they didn't get murdered, the three stumble upon the only surviving humans in town: Byron Von Jones (Tony Medlin), a trigger-happy, conspiracy theorist, militia member; Lynette Von Jones (Laura Stone), a worn, white-trash hussy; and Roy Jackson (Chris Gardner), a spineless, deceitful frat boy in his early 20s. The group is forced to band together and take shelter in Roy's ranch house, surrounded by hundreds of vampires intending to torch the property before sunrise.  The group must now try to last throughout the night with their bloodthirsty pursuers on their tail.

Cast

Reception
Philip Martin, writing for the Arkansas Democrat-Gazette, called it a "Cheesy self aware horror movie chockfull of gory gags and sex jokes, a few of which click. May find a home with cultists looking to adopt."  Adrian Halen, writing for Horror News, said, "This is a film I’ll watch again and again for years to come! I think this release will find its way on to many film viewers cult movies shelf."

References

External links 
 
 
 Blood on the Highway at The New York Times

2008 films
2008 horror films
American comedy horror films
American independent films
2000s English-language films
2000s American films